David Geoffrey Bickers (17 January 1938 – 6 July 2014) was an English professional motocross racer from Coddenham, Suffolk. He competed in the Motocross World Championships from 1959 to 1969. Bickers won two European motocross championships, and was a member of British motocross teams that won two Motocross des Nations events as well as two Trophée des Nations events. Bickers was awarded the Motorcycle News 'Man of the Year' award in 1960.

Motorcycling career
In the early 1960s, Bickers was one of the top motorcycle racers in the sport of scrambles, which eventually became more widely known by the European term 'motocross'. He began competing in motorcycle scrambles at the age of 15 just before the official age which he was eligible to ride, which was sixteen, and he was so successful that he was rewarded with a sponsorship from the Dot motorcycle company.

His riding talent got him noticed by Greeves factory rider, Brian Stonebridge, who then recommended that Bickers be hired by Greeves in 1958. He won two consecutive 250cc European motocross championships in 1960 and 1961 for the Greeves factory racing team. The European championship was considered to be the world championship at the time, as the sport of motocross had yet to develop outside of Europe. Bickers was a member of British teams that won the Trophée des Nations event in 1961 and in 1962. He also helped British teams win the Motocross des Nations in 1966 and 1967.

The middle-1960s saw the start of the move away from traditional large-capacity four-stroke engines to two-strokes. From 1966 Bickers rode for CZ alongside teammates Joël Robert and Roger De Coster. He was the UK importer for the 250 cc and 360 cc CZ scramblers together with a trials bike, followed by CZ roadsters and Jawa models in 1973, selling both marques initially from his premises at Woodbridge Road, Ipswich, Suffolk, followed by a move to Farthing Road Industrial Estate, Ipswich.

As one of the first European riders to race in the United States, Bickers helped to introduce Americans to the sport of motocross. He placed second in the 1971 Inter-AMA Motocross series behind CZ teammate Vlastimil Valek. He also competed in the Trans-AMA motocross series in 1971 and 1972.

Film industry career
After retiring from competition, Bickers started a company manufacturing stunt equipment used in the film industry.  He also appeared as a stunt double for Roger Moore in Octopussy and Escape to Athena among other film work.

Bickers died after a stroke on 6 July 2014.

References

External links
 Bickers Action – Film stunt equipment
 

2014 deaths
1938 births
People from Coddenham
British motocross riders
Enduro riders
English stunt performers